Hometown is a city in Cook County, Illinois, United States. The population was 4,343 at the 2020 census.

History 
Joseph E. Merrion developed inexpensive duplex houses in Hometown after World War II, targeting former GIs and their families. Hometown incorporated in 1953, and its population peaked at over 7,000 in 1958. On April 21, 1967, an F4/F5 rated tornado tore through Hometown, devastating the area, and destroying 86 homes while damaging 500 others.

Geography

Hometown borders the city of Chicago along 87th Street between Cicero Avenue and Pulaski Road. The town's southern border is located one-half mile south of 87th, where 91st Street would be.

Demographics
As of the 2020 census there were 4,343 people, 1,745 households, and 955 families residing in the city. The racial makeup of the city was 73.87% White, 2.28% African American, 0.94% Asian, 0.58% Native American, 0.05% Pacific Islander, 11.01% from other races, and 11.28% from two or more races. Hispanic or Latino of any race were 25.74% of the population.

There were 1,745 households, out of which 51.69% had children under the age of 18 living with them, 40.92% were married couples living together, 11.46% had a female householder with no husband present, and 45.27% were non-families. 40.57% of all households were made up of individuals, and 15.36% had someone living alone who was 65 years of age or older. The average household size was 3.42 and the average family size was 2.41.

The city's age distribution consisted of 22.6% under the age of 18, 9.5% from 18 to 24, 24.5% from 25 to 44, 31% from 45 to 64, and 12.5% who were 65 years of age or older. The median age was 38.0 years. For every 100 females, there were 87.1 males. For every 100 females age 18 and over, there were 85.2 males.

The median income for a household in the city was $51,487, and the median income for a family was $63,523. Males had a median income of $39,034 versus $30,449 for females. The per capita income for the city was $24,378. About 1.5% of families and 6.0% of the population were below the poverty line, including 2.2% of those under age 18 and 15.6% of those age 65 or over.

Note: the US Census treats Hispanic/Latino as an ethnic category. This table excludes Latinos from the racial categories and assigns them to a separate category. Hispanics/Latinos can be of any race.

Government
Hometown is located in the 1st district for the Cook County Board of Review, the 11th district on the Cook County Board of Commissioners, and the 3rd judicial subcircuit. The 2011 redistricting places Hometown in Illinois's 3rd congressional district, Illinois's 16th legislative district, and Illinois's 31st house district. Public education is provided by Oak Lawn-Hometown School District 123, Oak Lawn Community High School, and Moraine Valley Community College. The Hometown Fire Protection District, which is coterminous with the municipality, provides fire protection services.

For the purposes of elections, Hometown is split into three precincts; Worth Township 47, Worth Township 53, and Worth Township 82. In the 2020 presidential election, Hometown cast 995 votes for Joe Biden and Kamala Harris (51.6%) and cast 908 votes (47.1%) for Donald Trump and Mike Pence. Twenty-four voters chose third party candidates and thirteen voters pulled a ballot, but abstained from voting for any candidate for President. Voter turnout was 66.5%.

References

Chicago metropolitan area
Cities in Cook County, Illinois
Populated places established in 1953
1953 establishments in Illinois